Kirsi Rautava (born 22 June 1978) is a Finnish snowboarder. She competed in the women's halfpipe event at the 2002 Winter Olympics.

References

External links
 

1978 births
Living people
Finnish female snowboarders
Olympic snowboarders of Finland
Snowboarders at the 2002 Winter Olympics
People from Kajaani
Sportspeople from Kainuu